On 9 August 2020, a major fire broke out in early morning hours (around 5am IST) at a COVID-19 facility located at the Hotel Swarna Palace in the city of Vijayawada, in the state of Andhra Pradesh. The fire blaze killed 11 people and wounded a further 22. The hotel was used as a temporary COVID-19 facility as it was leased out by the private hospital Ramesh Hospitals Vijayawada for the purpose of treating infected COVID-19 patients. An electrical short circuit was described as the ultimate reason for the incident. The fire had been brought under control by the firefighters within a space of 30 minutes. The patients who survived from the fire blaze were transferred to another quarantine centre.

Background 
India has recorded numerous cases related to fire accidents in the history mainly due to lack of safety facilities and inadequate fire extinguishers. The Visakhapatnam gas leak, the Delhi factory fire, and the Delhi hotel fire were the country's worst fire accidents in the recent times. India is currently the second worst affected country in the world due to the COVID-19 pandemic and the fire incident has posed further burden and humiliation to the healthcare sector impacted by the COVID-19 pandemic in India.

Incident 
The fire blaze erupted at the Vijayawada coronavirus hotel facility killing around 11 COVID-19 patients, injuring 22 others. The fire broke out initially in the first floor and second floor before spreading quickly to third and fifth floors. It was reported that two patients who were panickingly rushed, screamed for help and jumped from the hotel terrace to escape from the blaze. Nine patients died due to suffocation caused by fire blaze and one reportedly died succumbing to burn injuries. There were a total of about 30 patients being treated for COVID-19 along with ten hospital staff prior to the incident.

Development 
Ramesh Hospitals Vijayawada branch had Memorandum of understanding agreement with the Swarna Palace Hotel to run and maintain a COVID-19 centre on a lease basis. It was revealed that the COVID-19 centre was opened in the Swarna Palace on 9 August 2020 and on the same day itself a fire broke out due to electrical defects. A FIR was also filed against both the Ramesh Hospitals and the Swarna Palace for the possible acknowledgment regarding the electrical defects before establishing the COVID-19 centre. Vijayawada COVID-19 hotel facility was later blamed for violating fire safety norms and measures.

Response 
Andhra Pradesh CM YS Jagan Mohan Reddy announced a relief package compensation of five million rupees for the affected families. Indian Prime Minister Narendra Modi expressed his deep condolences regarding the tragic incident and tweeted that he was anguished by the terrible incident.

References 

Vijayawada fire
Vijayawada fire
2020s in Andhra Pradesh
Vijayawada fire
Building and structure fires in India
Vijayawada